Freshmart (styled as freshmart) is a chain of supermarkets based in Ontario, Canada. It is a unit of Loblaw Companies Limited, Canada's largest food distributor.

Background 

Freshmart stores are typically operated by a franchise owner. The stores operate in smaller locations than others operated by Loblaw Companies Limited, typically in rural communities.

See also
 List of supermarket chains in Canada

Companies based in Brampton
Loblaw Companies
Supermarkets of Canada